The Unseen in Between is the fourth studio album by American singer-songwriter Steve Gunn. It was released on January 18, 2019 through Matador Records.

Track listing

Charts

References

2019 albums
Matador Records albums